The Australian Nickelodeon Kids' Choice Awards was an annual awards show that awarded entertainers with a blimp trophy, as voted by children. The show was usually held during October or November and a televised show was produced, touted as the "biggest party for kids on the planet". The Australian Nickelodeon Kids' Choice Awards were discontinued after 2011 and replaced by Nickelodeon Slimefest from 2012, although domestic categories continue to be voted for and awarded during continuity carried during the annual tape-delayed airing of the main US ceremony.

Host cities

Hosts

Winners

2003
No Information

2004

2005

2006

2007

2008

2009

2010

2011

Nickelodeon Slimefest

Nickelodeon Slimefest is an Australian annual music festival held at Sydney Olympic Park. The show is held in September and televised on Nickelodeon. The festival replaced the Nickelodeon Australian Kids' Choice Awards in 2012.

See also
Nickelodeon US Kids' Choice Awards
Nickelodeon UK Kids' Choice Awards

References

External links
Official Nickelodeon Australian Kids' Choice Awards Website (2005)
Official Nickelodeon Australian Kids' Choice Awards Website (2006)
Official Nickelodeon Australian Kids' Choice Awards Website (2007)
Official Nickelodeon Australia Website
Official Nickelodeon America Website

Nickelodeon Kids' Choice Awards
Australian music awards
Nickelodeon (Australia and New Zealand) original programming
Awards established in 2003
Awards disestablished in 2011
2003 establishments in Australia
2011 disestablishments in Australia